The Croydon by-election, 1895 may refer to:

 Croydon by-election, May 1895
 Croydon by-election, July 1895